Tatyana Nikitichna Tolstaya (born May 3, 1951) is a Russian writer, TV host, publicist, novelist, and essayist from the Tolstoy family.

Family
Tolstaya was born in Leningrad into a family of writers. Her paternal grandfather, Aleksei Nikolaevich Tolstoy, was a pioneering science fiction writer, and the son of Count Nikolay Alexandrovich Tolstoy (1849–1900) and Alexandra Leontievna Turgeneva (1854–1906), a relative of Decembrist Nikolay Turgenev and the writer Ivan Turgenev. Tolstaya's paternal grandmother was the poet Natalia Krandievskaya. Mikhail Lozinsky (1886-1955), her maternal grandfather, was a literary translator renowned for his translation of Dante's The Divine Comedy. Tolstaya's sister, Natalia was a writer as well. Her son, Artemy Lebedev, is the founder-owner of Art. Lebedev Studio, a Russian web design firm.

Life and work

1951—1983: early years 
Tatiana Tolstaya was born in Leningrad to a physicist professor  and Natalya Mikhailovna Lozinskaya.

In 1974, Tolstaya graduated from the department of classical philology of the Leningrad State University. In the same year, she married a philologist Andrey Lebedev. The couple moved to Moscow in the early 1980s, where Tolstaya started working in the Nauka publishing house.

As recalled by Tolstaya, in November 1982 she underwent an operation on her eyes and had to spend three months in rehabilitation, unable to see in the bright light. She believes that period brought her into writing: without a constant flow of information from the world, her mind cleared and she discovered in herself a desire to write down plots and stories.

1983—1989: start of literary career 

In 1983, Tolstaya emerged as a literary critic.

Her first short story, On the Golden Porch (На золотом крыльце сидели), appeared in Avrora magazine in 1983 and marked the start of Tolstaya's literary career, and her story collection of the same name established Tolstaya as one of the foremost writers of the perestroika and post-Soviet period. As Michiko Kakutani writes, "one can find echoes...of her great-granduncle Leo Tolstoy's work - his love of nature, his psychological insight, his attention to the details of everyday life". But "her luminous, haunting stories most insistently recall the work of Chekhov, mapping characters' inner lives and unfulfilled dreams with uncommon sympathy and insight", and also display "the author's Nabokovian love of language and her affinity for strange excursions into the surreal, reminiscent of Bulgakov and Gogol." In 1987, a collection of short stories under the same title — "On the Golden Porch" — was translated into English and received positive reviews. When in 1988 the book was released in Russia, more than 50,000 copies were sold out in hours.

1990—1999: life in the USA and journalism 

In 1990, Tolstaya with her family emigrated to the United States. She began teaching Russian literature and creative writing first at Princeton, then at Skidmore College, and gave lectures in multiple universities. She also emerged as a journalist and contributed to the New York Review of Books, The New Yorker, TLS, the Wilson Quarterly, and also wrote for Russia-based editions such as the Moscow News, the Capital and Russian Telegraph.

In 1988, Tatyana and her sister Natalya co-authored a book of short stories which was released under the title Sisters.

2000—2012: The Slynx, The School for Scandal, speechwriting 

In the early 1990s Tolstaya worked in speechwriting for the Union of Right Forces party along with screenwriter and journalist Dunya Smirnova and literary critic .

In 1999, Tolstaya moved back to Russia. The next year she released her novel The Slynx (Кысь), a dystopian vision of post-nuclear Russian life in what was once (now forgotten) Moscow, presenting a negative Bildungsroman that in part confronts "disappointments of post-Soviet Russian political and social life". It has been described as "an account of a degraded world that is full of echoes of the sublime literature of Russia’s past; a grinning portrait of human inhumanity; a tribute to art in both its sovereignty and its helplessness; a vision of the past as the future in which the future is now". As confessed by the writer, it took her more than 14 years to compose the novel. By 2003, more than 200,000 copies of The Slynx were sold.

Soon after the release of The Slynx, three more books of Tolstaya were published. Two collections of short stories under the titles “Day” and “Night” were followed by the Two, co-authored with her sister Natalya.

For the twelve years between 2002 and 2014, with her friend  Tolstaya co-hosted a Russian cultural television programme, The School for Scandal (Школа злословия, named after Richard Sheridan's play), on which she conducted interviews with diverse representatives of contemporary Russian culture and politics. In 2003,  The School for Scandal was awarded Best Talk Show prize by the Russian National Television.

In 2010, with her niece Olga Prokhorova Tolstaya released The Same ABC of Buratino — a collection of poems that should have been inside the book that Buratino had sold away. In an interview to a Russian magazine Tolstaya confessed that she had nurtured the idea of this book since childhood, but only when her children grew up her niece ‘picked up’ the project and helped to write the book.

After 2013 

On June 12, 2015, The New Yorker published The Square, a dark homage to the nothingness of Kazimir Malevich's 1915 painting, Black Square, which concludes with a self-referential paragraph.

In 2018, a collection of short stories under the title Aetherial Worlds was released in Russia. Written in a playful and poetic language, the stories are a mixture of real and fictional recollections of her childhood, her travels and family. Soon it was translated into English and received positive acclaims.

In 2020, she was awarded the Writer of the Year prize. This award honours prolific writers for their long time contribution to Russian literature.

Bibliography

Books translated into English

 Sleepwalker in a Fog, Alfred A. Knopf, New York, 1991, then Vintage Books, 1993;

Selected shorter fiction

Essays and reporting

References

Further reading

 Goscilo, Helena. 1996. The Explosive World of Tatyana N. Tolstaya's Fiction. Armonk, NY: M. E. Sharpe.

External links
About Tatyana Tolstaya 
Tolstaya in the Internet litcafe 
Several reviews of Kys  


1951 births
20th-century women writers
Living people
Russian women novelists
Russian publishers (people)
Russian women short story writers
Russian television personalities
Saint Petersburg State University alumni
Soviet novelists
Soviet short story writers
20th-century Russian short story writers
Soviet women writers
The New Yorker people
Tolstoy family
Russian women essayists
Writers from Saint Petersburg
20th-century essayists
20th-century Russian women
Soviet women novelists